The Prose Life of Alexander is a Middle English prose romance extant in a single copy, found in the mid-fifteenth century Lincoln Thornton Manuscript. It was edited by J. S. Westlake for the Early English Text Society.

References
Notes

Bibliography

15th-century books
15th-century manuscripts
Middle English literature
15th century in England
Alexander Romance